Cyclopogon elatus is a species of terrestrial orchids. It is widespread across much of Latin America from Mexico and Belize  to Argentina, as well as in the West Indies and southern Florida.

References

External links 
IOSPE orchid photos, Cyclopogon elatus (Sw.) Schltr. 1919 Photo courtesy of Eric Hunt
Swiss Orchid Foundation at Herbarium Jany Renz, Cyclopogon elatus 
Orquídeas de Misiones (Argentina), sábado, 19 de abril de 2008 Cyclopogon elatus (Sw.) Schltr. 

Spiranthinae
Plants described in 1788
Orchids of Central America
Orchids of Belize
Orchids of South America
Orchids of North America
Flora of the Caribbean
Flora of Florida
Flora without expected TNC conservation status